Loveniidae is a family of heart urchins in the order Spatangoida.

Description and characteristics
These sea urchins are called "heart urchins" due to their specific shape, looking like a heart when seen from below (more or less depending on the genus). The mouth is located between the two cheeks, and the anus below the tip.

Genera
According to the World Register of Marine Species: 
 genus Araeolampas Serafy, 1974
 genus Atelospatangus Koch, 1885 †
 genus Breynia Desor, in Agassiz & Desor, 1847
 genus Chuniola Gagel, 1903 †
 sub-family Echinocardiinae Cooke, 1942
 genus Echinocardium Gray, 1825
 genus Gualtieria Desor, in Agassiz & Desor, 1847 †
 genus Hemipatagus Desor, 1858 †
 genus Laevipatagus Noetling, 1885 †
 genus Lovenia Desor, in Agassiz & Desor, 1847
 genus Pseudolovenia A. Agassiz & H.L. Clark, 1907b
 genus Semipetalion Szörényi, 1963 †
 genus Spatangomorpha Boehm, 1882 †

References
 
 

Spatangoida